Zuidzijde is a hamlet in the Dutch province of South Holland.

Zuidzijde is not a statistical entity, and considered part of Nieuw-Beijerland and Zuid-Beijerland. It has place name signs, and consists of about 100 houses.

On 27 August 2022 seven people died in Zuidzijde when a truck drove off a dike into a neighborhood party.

References

Populated places in South Holland
Hoeksche Waard